Visual Collaborative is an American festival and publishing platform highlighting the intersections of people, commerce, and innovation. Acclaim for its social impact in humanities, it was featured by VOA, for advancing the cause of humanities and the creative economy. The platform organizes exhibitions that feature talks, art, technology, development, and live music performances. Over the years, the initiative has grown in scope and size, aligning with sustainable goals.

History 
In 2006, Visual Collaborative was founded by designer and technologist  Ade Olufeko, to bridge the gap between creative professionals and their commercial value. Since originating in Minneapolis, Visual Collaborative has showcased collections and talks in Minneapolis, Miami, New York City, The Mission San Francisco California, Columbia Maryland, and Washington D.C.

In 2007, the group's inaugural event featured international artists Miko Simmons and Linda Zacks, which took place at the original Center for Independent Artists, inside Instituto de Cultura y Educacion located in a community of South Minneapolis. In 2011, in Washington D.C., Visual Collaborative produced an exhibition featuring emerging and established artists with a collection described as vibrant new art.  In 2015, the platform collaborated with the Arts District Hyattsville Master Association in Hyattsville, utilizing the Lustine Center to host a group exhibition themed Vanity.

Operating model 
Up until 2015, the platform's exhibitions occurred as disruptive innovation in a traveling formatted pattern. They have been held in reputable galleries, lofts or donated spaces by private owners who include art enthusiasts and lifelong patrons of the arts. They are executed through joint ventures with other arts and humanities organisations  which have in the past included Arts District Hyattsville Master Association in Prince George's County and Voices for Children Miami. In April 2019, Visual Collaborative launched an open access online collective called Polaris, also documented as North Star by the Library of Congress, ISSN 2642-9780.

Visual Collaborative is a platform that represents artists and works of diverse backgrounds. Its past emerging and notable features include: Aniekan Udofia, Tiphanie Brooke, Dawn Okoro, Danielle Eckhardt, Eugene Ankomah and music recording artist TolumiDE.

In 2008, Visual Collaborative adopted an outreach model, partnering with Voices for Children Miami-Dade, a Children Foundation that raises funds for abused and neglected children in Miami-Dade County—The organisation gave their proceeds to charity to help build the bridge between the community and the arts.

Exhibitions 
Events held in U.S cities before publishing expansion:

2007, Minneapolis, Minnesota, Center for Independent Artists 
2008, Design District, Miami, Florida, Undercurrent Arts Miami Gallery
2011, Queens Gambit, Forest Hills and Fresh Meadows, Queens, NY Crepe N Tearia
2011, Black, White + Monochrome & Color, San Francisco, California, Wonderland SF Gallery
2011, Visual Grandeur, Adams Morgan, Washington, D.C.
2012, 14th Street, Washington, D.C.
2013 VII, ENCORE Columbia, Maryland, pop-up store 
2014, Cambridge, Massachusetts, Harvard University
2015, Vanity, Gateway Arts District, Hyattsville, Maryland, The LUSTINE Center

Publishing 
In April 2019, Visual Collaborative launched an open access online collective called Polaris, also documented as North Star by the Library of Congress, ISSN 2642-9780. The project commenced in the winter of 2019 for a period of three months. The interdisciplinary collective featured 26 practitioners from various disciplines from the United States, Europe and African metropolitan cites such as Lagos and Cairo. Articles from the catalog received coverage from various news media for highlighting the intersections of people, commerce and innovation. The Polaris catalogue explores creative disciplines, perspectives and intrinsic value of the featured practitioners and how they interact with society. Polaris features both established or emerging people in the creative industry, intersecting with anthropology and humanities. Its subtopics may include health and wellness, architecture, fashion, entertainment news and non-partisan political themes. In addition to covering professionals from regions around the globe, the content aims to boost literacy in various socioeconomic circles.
In June 2019 bringing in the summer equinox, the second volume of the Polaris series featuring 25 people was released under the title Voyager. Exploring life journeys of the invited participants in long form interview format, topics and subjects related to influence, economic disparities, pragmatism, self awareness and youth leadership among others were covered. Grammy-nominated music artist and performer Seun Kuti, the youngest son of legendary afrobeat pioneer Fela Kuti appeared as one of the main features. Other features included Pan-African activist Aya Chebbi, the first ever African Union Youth Envoy, Marcie Rendon an Award-winning playwright, poet and writer of native American Ojibwe ancestry and Minneapolis Civil Rights Commissioner, Anika Robbins.

In the Voyager collective, some of the interviews are presented in both the French and English language, accommodating featured influencers from French speaking regions. In the same month, during pre-coverage of Voyager's release, forthcoming issues were announced.

"It’s refreshing to see younger people interested in creating, contextualizing, re-defining, preserving, and chronicling art, culture, and history." said Kaia Black, of the Smithsonian National Portrait Gallery, who appeared in volume II of the collective.

2020 TwentyEightyFour 
In May 2020, international news outlets announced the release of the TwentyEightyFour series. The 5th volume of the Polaris catalog consisted of conducted and transcribed interviews, among the 21 participants featured French music sisters Les Nubians, Metal Gear music and soundtrack composer Rika Muranaka, Global business strategist Busie Matsiko-Andan, Comedian Chigul, Electronic music artist Coppé and a reprised conversation of Nollywood actress Dakore Akande. Themes of adaptability and empathy ran consistently across the collective, aiming as a reprieve and alternative to the COVID-19 pandemic media barrage.

Polaris interviews 
Selected features from over 150 guests from the Polaris catalogue Volumes 1–10. Credits from The Punch, This Day, Vanguard, The Guardian and Business Day news.

 Cheri Beasley
 Robert Greene (American author)
 Bahia Shehab 
 Seun Kuti
 Autumn Whitehurst 
 Tosin Oshinowo
 Jens Gad 
 Joyce Adewumi 
 Bobby Yan 
 Polly Alakija 
 Irene Hernandez-Feiks 
 Theda Sandiford
 Ayo Binitie II 
 Remi Vaughan-Richards 
 TolumiDE 
 Valerie Alloix 
 Michael Elegbede 
 Tiphanie Brooke (Antigirl) 
 Indira Lindsay Roberts
 Les Nubians
 Dakore Akande
 Chris Uwaje
 Aya Chebbi
 Fatima Al Ansar
 Dawn Okoro
 Kate Worum
 Fiona Tokple
 Shannon Shiang
 Kaia Black
 Berla Mundi
 Seun Kentebe
 Funfere Koroye
 Marcie Rendon
 Aramide Abe
 Rika Muranaka
 Anika Robbins
 Jardena Kifle
 David Hayter
Swaady Martin
 Kelli Ali
 Kristy Jones-Cooper
 Husani Oakley 
 Adelaide Damoah
 Nse Ikpe-Etim
 Loubna Baker
 Michelle Antoinette Nelson
 Alec Huxley
 Adegbe Ogbeh
 Desdamona
 Uthman Wahaab
 Kevin Chaja
 Marcia Ashong
 Dr. Sonita Singh
 Tracy Alero Doyle
 Melissa Trevino Berendzen
 Nkwo Onwuka
 Telesa Via
 Jess Ellen Henderson
 Ana Martins (Aheneah)
Bisila Bokoko
William Coupon
Ade Adekola 
Shannon Shiang
Busie Matsiko-Andan
Xárene Eskandar
Chigul
David Carson
Ervin “EP” Pope
Naomi Assaraf
Nere Emiko Teriba
Dele Ajayi-Smith
Coppé
Gülnara Khalilova
Michel Rothschild
Sarasara
Oliver Nakakande
Sahib Pashazadeh
Tan Haur 
Carolyn Woodruff
Selamawit Worku 
Yumiko Kayukawa 
Seow Beng Lan
Lynn Vartan
Chinedu Echeruo
Jack lawson
Aditi Patil

References

External links

American artist groups and collectives
Conferences in the United States
Community development
Art exhibitions in the United States
Contemporary art exhibitions
Traveling exhibits
 List
Recurring events established in 2007
collaborative projects